"The Story to End All Stories for Harlan Ellison's Anthology Dangerous Visions" (1968) is a 117-word short story by Philip K. Dick, written as an addendum, or spiritual sequel to "Faith of Our Fathers". It is a simply written account of a decadent, dystopian, post-apocalyptic society, characterised by inter-species sex, infanticide, and cannibalism (the story can be read in its entirety below). The story is symbolic and satirical, reflecting ideas of divinity and the consequences of war, themes which figure large in the author's writing.

It was first published in the science fiction fanzine Niekas, before finding its way into Dick's own The Eye of the Sibyl. The latter portion of the story's title refers to the sci-fi anthology Dangerous Visions (1967), edited by Harlan Ellison, in which "Faith of Our Fathers" first appeared. Dangerous Visions has been credited as a milestone of sex and sexuality in speculative fiction; sex is a major motif in "Stories", especially the non-mainstream, bestial, and even depraved varieties. In this sense, the sex depicted is not erotic, but horrifying.

Full text

In a hydrogen war ravaged society the nubile young women go down to a futuristic zoo and have sexual intercourse with various deformed and non-human life forms in the cages. In this particular account a woman who has been patched together out of the damaged bodies of several women has intercourse with an alien female, there in the cage, and later on the woman, by means of futuristic science, conceives. The infant is born, and she and the female in the cage fight over it to see who gets it. The human young woman wins, and promptly eats the offspring, hair, teeth, toes and all. Just after she has finished she discovers that the offspring is God.

References

1968 short stories
Short stories by Philip K. Dick
Dystopian literature
Fantasy short stories
Dangerous Visions short stories